Suicheng may refer to the following locations in China:

 Suicheng, Suixi County, Guangdong (遂城镇), town
 Suicheng, Jianning County (濉城镇), town in Fujian
 Suicheng, Xushui County (遂城镇), town in Hebei